Zumar Lake is a lake in Kenora District, Ontario, Canada, and the source of the Ekwan River, which flows into James Bay.

See also
List of lakes in Ontario

References

Lakes of Kenora District